Pengornis is the largest known enantiornithine bird from the Early Cretaceous of northeast China. The name derives from "Peng", which refers to a mythological bird from Chinese folklore, and "-ornis", which means bird in Greek.

Pengornis is known from a single adult fossil, described by Zhou et al. in 2008. This holotype is in the collection of the Institute of Vertebrate Paleontology and Paleoanthropology in Beijing China. Its accession number is IVPP V15336. It was collected from the Jiufotang Formation, at Dapingfang, Chaoyang, Liaoning China. A second, juvenile specimen was described by Hu, Zhou, and O'Connor in 2014.

Pengornis shows characters of the humeral head, acromion, and anterior cervical vertebrae, that were previously known only in members of the Ornithurae. A phylogenetic analysis by Zhou et al. reduces to just three the number of characters that support enantiornithine monophyly. Thus, Pengornis supports the possibility that enantiornithines and Ornithurines may not be distinct clades.

References

Bird genera
Early Cretaceous birds of Asia
Enantiornitheans
Fossil taxa described in 2008